Yarrow River, a perennial stream of the Clarence River catchment, is located in the Northern Tablelands district of New South Wales, Australia.

Course and features
Yarrow River rises below Mitchell Hill, on the slopes of the Great Dividing Range, near Glencoe and flows generally north east, before reaching its confluence with the Mann River, near Oakdale and east of Glen Innes. The river descends  over its  course; and flows through the Mann River Nature Reserve.

See also

 Rivers of New South Wales

References

 

Rivers of New South Wales
Northern Rivers
Northern Tablelands